Francisco "Fran" Justo Rodríguez (born 24 August 1989) is a Spanish football manager and former player who played as a midfielder.

Career
Born in Ourense, Galicia, Justo represented hometown sides Pabellón Ourense CF, CD Velle and Ponte Ourense CF as a youth. He made his senior debut with the latter, but retired in 2013, aged just 23, to pursue a coaching career; he was already in charge of the club's youth setup.

In June 2013, Justo was appointed manager of SD Nogueira de Ramuín in the Primeira Autonómica, and achieved promotion to the Preferente Autonómica in the following year. In 2015, after suffering relegation, he left the club and returned to Ourense's youth sides.

On 28 June 2016, Justo was named in charge of the first team of Ourense, also in the Preferente. He achieved promotion to Tercera División in his first season, and renewed his contract on 22 May 2018.

On 3 August 2020, after narrowly missing out promotion with Ourense in the previous campaign, Justo was appointed at the helm of CD Arenteiro also in the fourth division. He achieved promotion to the new fourth tier named Segunda División RFEF in his first year, and renewed his contract on 5 June 2021.

In the 2022–23 season, Justo led Arenteiro to the top of their group, aside from knocking out La Liga side UD Almería from the Copa del Rey. On 23 November 2022, he moved straight to Segunda División after replacing Hernán Pérez in charge of CD Lugo.

Justo's first professional match in charge occurred on 27 November 2022, as Lugo drew 1–1 against Levante UD. The following 31 January, after six defeats in nine matches, he was sacked.

Managerial statistics

References

External links

1989 births
Living people
Footballers from Ourense
Spanish footballers
Association football midfielders
Divisiones Regionales de Fútbol players
Ourense CF players
Spanish football managers
Segunda División managers
Segunda Federación managers
Tercera División managers
Ourense CF managers
CD Arenteiro managers
CD Lugo managers